Chuang Tse and the First Emperor is a novel by Italian writer Anna Russo.  Published in 2010, the story questions the reader's view of reality.

Plot
The story begins 2,222 years ago.

Contravening any historical fact, Zhen Li, King of Qin, having unified the six states in which the kingdom was divided into, undertook the title of Qin Shi Huang, or rather the first august emperor, reviving with him the very beginning of time. 
To delete any historical fact that would have illegitimated his power and following his trusted Minister Shi Lu's recommendations, had ordered that any text so far written be destroyed and to obtain the largest possible number of hard labor prisoners for the construction of the Great Wall, the terracotta army, and his three hundred and sixty-five room palace, extended sentences which would have punished not only the responsible but its entire family, as well.
It was because of a book and the extension of the penalties that Chuang Tse's family was deported. Chuang Tse was saved thanks to his foresighted mother who had not registered him at birth, making him unknown to the civil service.
Eleven years had past from that day. Chuang Tse had grown up as did his longing for revenge.

In the meantime, the first emperor had attained an immeasurable power and proved to be a cruel and despotic tyrant. He had thousands of enemies which he had to watch from and despite all the propitiatory rites, the stars had predicted for him a terrible defeat and a reign of only eleven years. Yet the emperor was not aware that the time of that most terrible enemy had arrived.

That morning, like every morning, Chuang Tse set out for the banks of the river with his yellow canoe. He had been warned not to sail towards the sea, but Chuang was anxious to experiment the Emperor's latest invention: a compass. The emperor had assured him that the use of that instrument would have always helped him find the right direction, but for the moment Chuang had not yet understood its mechanism.

Distracted and near the sea by now, he had not noticed the arrival of a storm. Carried away, the boy lost his grip and sank under the waves. Down below he distinguished the presence of a wall that was not visible from the surface. He had no time to investigate: the violent waves hurled him against the wall. 
Trapped in some sort of channel, convinced he was dead and now within the tunnel that connects the world of the living with that of the dead, he was still certain of this state when he re-emerged in the middle of a bright colored garden of a mysterious palace unknown to anyone.

Chang Tse was determined to become the first to discover this secret place.

But the palace was not an easy place to explore, besides being rather disquieting: the four sides of the garden were decorated with the figures of mythological animals accompanying one to the afterworld, yet the magnificence of the place did not bring one to presume of a burial chamber. 

It was then and while he was hidden behind the bushes, that Chuang Tse saw him for the first time. 
He was flying... or rather, it was the impression he gave.
He suddenly appeared from the far end of the immense room and moved as if its feet never touched the ground. 
He did not make any noise, not even the smallest murmur. Without doubt must have been of noble birth judging from the palace and the garments he was wearing; even if, ever since Ying Zheng became first emperor, in fear of rebellion, forced all aristocrats to move into the capital city and that palace was just much too far from there.

He was absorbed in his thoughts when he glanced at the face of the small being. He there realized that he was just a child and that he could have been almost his same age. His skin was as white as alabaster and his mouth seemed a rose-colored line placed on his face in form of a smile. The nose was perfect and his eyes... were closed. 

Suddenly, the mysterious child disappeared and Chuang decided he was no longer eager to do any further investigation: the place was beginning to haunt him.
He returned to the same spot from which he had entered, but the grating from which he had gotten by was now closed and too heavy to be raised by a child. 
Chuang was trapped, but he did not lose faith: he would have found the way out elsewhere. 
Forced to enter the palace, he finally made acquaintance with the small boy and discovered, thanks to a hidden tablet, that the boy was the Emperor's secret son.
The boy was blind from birth, but the Emperor could not reveal to the people that he had generated a son of the darkness and, being of divine descent, nor take his life. He therefore put to death all those who knew about his existence and confined the boy in the secret palace in the middle of a forest.

Considering his nature, Chuang Tse would have gravely yearned to return to the first Emperor's progeny, all the evil that the Emperor had inflicted on his family, but realized that the child was just another victim, just like they all were, if not the one that paid the highest price, being so close to the first Emperor: he had been deprived of his life, even if in a more subtle manner, having his existence been denied.

In the world of obscurity in which the child lived in, the alternated silence of water pelting, sounds and animal calls was all he knew. 
Yet, despite all this, when he spoke of his father he proudly exclaimed, ”My father is the most powerful man on earth. And even the most righteous, the strongest and most valorous…” then he stopped, remained in silence for a moment and puzzled, concluded: "But I do not know him! “

And while these words still hovered over their heads in the middle of the room and the child remained motionless in his sorrow, Chuang Tse made his first decision as an adult and behaved as the best of men: it was the first time he had heard someone speak worthily of the first emperor and it was also the first time he had no intention in contradicting those words.

After a long silence, the child looked up to Chuang and in a boldly manner said: ”My father cannot come to see me because he is very busy! He created the greatest empire on earth. My father created the world! This is what the scribes say!”; then unexpectedly he stopped, and confused and almost imploring, as if to gather all the courage on earth to speak, asked Chuang; “Please, you who know many things, tell me… how is the world that my father created?”

It was then that Chuang unconsciously accomplished his destiny. 
	
As first thing, he gave his new friend a name. He called him Qi, that, according to his knowledge, had no meaning: energy that generated all changes; that was the essence of Qi's world; as second thing, decided to fill up that emptiness with the description of the world not as his father had actually created it, but to not disappoint the boy, like it would have one day been, and to start off nicely, began from the description of what Qi knew best: his palace.

He illustrated a marvelous world without war or oppression, without pain or sickness, in which time flowed slowly. 
And thus Chuang depicted a world that was the exact opposite of the world that Qi's father had actually created but at the same time, had told no lie: to not  dishearten his friend, he described the future.

Qi did not live alone in the palace; three servants looked after him and one of them was arriving. Obviously, nobody was aware of Chuang's presence and if they would have founded him, it would have meant the end; meanwhile the scribe was getting closer: one further step and he would have seen them. 
Frightened, Chuang looked around himself, but there was nowhere to hide. He looked at Qi's face that had turned pale in the meantime and it was then that he came up with an idea.
Chuang quickly hid himself under Qi's immense yellow mantle and spontaneously began to whisper some suggestions to Qi that he systematically repeated, making the scribe think that the child had gained his sight.

Happily, the scribe brought back the news to the other servants who rushed, while Qi and Chuang were forced to continue in their deception; but by now Qi had understood how things worked in this world and how men behaved; to Chuang's surprise, Qi knew exactly what was happening around him despite his blindness. 

All that was left to do was to tell the Emperor.

Despite all the defensive and preventive measures, the first Emperor had been poisoned by someone of whom he had never suspected of: himself. So now he waited. 

The scribe arrived and shouted: "Your son can see! We are not sure how long he has begun to see, even if we cannot say he actually sees with his eyes, but he sees much better and much farther ahead than all of us!”; 

The emperor, then, threw himself on the chair: he was happy, he was proud and was finally free to leave now; his sovereignty was over. 
His only order was to inform Qi's mother. 

Qi's mother had sought refuge in a mansion not far from the court and bred silkworms. At the good news, the Empress smiled and said something that she had never said before and for that same reason pronounced it with particular pride, ”May my son reign in all the lands beyond the sea, that have never appeared on any book or on any map and never shall be and neither he nor his kingdom be mentioned, until I say so! For the rest, may all those who are working on punishment make return to their homes. Their faults have been amnestied”.

That same day the servant returned to the capital city, rather shocked by the Empress's commands, which had gone far beyond her simple role as Emperor's wife. But having lost much time during his trip, which had brought him far away from his world, the servant could have not known what the Empress already knew thanks to her dreams, her butterflies and to her servant's faster horses: soon after speaking with the scribe, the Emperor died.

Shortly after that unusual conversation, a joyful moment had finally arrived in the life of the august and, thus, had not left any final messages. 

The court, unprepared for the event, had not announced the death to the community and hid the remains of the great Emperor in a box with salted fish on its return to the capital city, while plotting deceitful and swindling schemes in search for its successor.

The only thing that remained to do was to carry out the Empress's command, that finally saw the return of many people to their homes, including Chuang Tse's family, although little Qi, who was now called by this name, was furtively taken away from the secret palace and nor his name or his kingdom was ever mentioned again. 

By orders of his mother, he was entrusted with unknown islands off the coast of the Chinese sea, which never appeared on any map and which nobody ever spoke of. On these lands, Qi reigned wisely, creating that world, which he now clearly saw, and that little Chuang Tse, finally at home, had told him about.

The scribe, instead, returned to the Empress, took one end of that wonderful thread and brought it all over to the other side of the world, discovering people and countries, which were neither so frightening nor so different than his, and opened a wonderful road today still entitled: the silk route.

The world of Qi, as Chuang Tse had described to him and that the first emperor failed to create, still exists today. Some are certain that it is an island between the three mountains in the middle of the sea, Pongnae-san, Yôngju-san and Pangjang-san, home of the gods; others call it Peng Lai (Paradise), but wherever it may be and however it is called, Qi continues to reign over it, man continues to dream and all we have to do is to search for it... at the bottom of our hearts.

2010 Italian novels